Perissias taeniopterus, the striped-fin flounder, is a species of lefteye flounder native to the eastern Pacific Ocean along the coast of Central America from Mexico to Panama. This species grows to a length of  TL. This species is the only known member of its genus.

References
 

Bothidae
Fish described in 1890
Taxa named by David Starr Jordan